William P. James (16 July 1902 – 27 February 1972) was a Welsh rugby union and professional rugby league footballer who played in the 1920s.

Background
Will James was born in Aberavon, Wales, and he died 69 in Aberavon, Wales.

Playing career

International honours
Will James won caps for Wales (RU) while at Llanelli RFC in 1925 against England, and Scotland.

County honours
Will James played , i.e. number 2, in Glamorgan's 18-14 victory over Monmouthshire in the non-County Championship match during the 1926–27 season at Taff Vale Park, Pontypridd on Saturday 30 April 1927.

References

External links
Search for "James" at rugbyleagueproject.org

Statistics at wru.co.uk

1902 births
1972 deaths
Footballers who switched code
Glamorgan rugby league team players
Leeds Rhinos players
Llanelli RFC players
Rugby league players from Aberavon
Rugby league wingers
Rugby union players from Aberavon
Rugby union wings
Wales international rugby union players
Welsh rugby league players
Welsh rugby union players